2-sec-Butyl-4,5-dihydrothiazole (also known as SBT) is a thiazoline compound with the molecular formula C7H13NS. A volatile pheromone found in rodents such as mice and rats, SBT is excreted in the urine and promotes aggression amongst males while inducing synchronized estrus in females.

Binding to MUP
Mouse major urinary proteins (MUPs) are responsible for binding to hydrophobic ligands such as the pheromone SBT. SBT binds within MUP-I's barrel-shaped active site, forming a hydrogen bond with a water molecule within the active site, which in turn is stabilized by forming hydrogen bonds with residue Phe56 and another water molecule; this second water molecule also forms hydrogen bonds to residues in the active site, namely Leu58 and Thr39. SBT also forms van der Waals forces with several of MUP-I's residues, including Ala121, Leu123, Leu134, Leu72, Val100, and Phe108.

When bound, MUP safely carries SBT through the aqueous environment; once the protein-ligand complex is excreted in the urine, MUP helps prevent SBT decomposition and controls the slow release of SBT over a prolonged period of time, resulting in the physiological and behavioral responses of animals who come into contact with the pheromone.

Synthesis 
SBT can be produced from 3-(2-aminoethanethio)-4-methylhex-2-enenitrile; however, it is also possible to synthesize SBT from ethanolamine and 2-methylbutanoic acid, using Lawesson's reagent and microwave irradiation.

References 

Mammalian pheromones
Thiazolines